Zhishan (formerly transliterated as Chihshan Station until 2003) is a metro station in Taipei, Taiwan served by Taipei Metro. It is a station on the Tamsui-Xinyi Line. It is a planned transfer station on the Shezi Light Rail Line.

Station overview 

The two-level, elevated station structure with one island platform and two exits. The station is situated on Fuhua Road, near Fuguo Road entrance. The washrooms are inside the entrance area. The station's amenities include Chin Shan Yen Gate, Chin Shan Yen Hui Chi Temple, Shuangxi Park and Chinese Garden, The Xiqu Center of Taiwan, Taipei American School, SOGO and Carrefour branches.

History 
This station was opened on 28 March 1997, originally there is only one exit at Fuguo Road. On 20 November 2010, a second exit facing Dexing West Road (exit 2) opened for use.

Station layout

First and Last Train Timing 
The first and last train timing at Daan Park station  is as follows:

Notable Landmarks
 Tianmu Area

Historical Landmarks / Sports 
 Chin Shan Yen Gate
 Tianmu Baseball Stadium

School 
 Taipei American School
 Taipei Japanese School
 University of Taipei

Shopping Center/Cinemas 
 
 Shin Kong Mitsukoshi Tianmu Branch
 
 Fareastern SOGO department store Tianmu Branch

References 

Tamsui–Xinyi line stations
Railway stations opened in 1997